Royal Meeker (February 23, 1873 – August 16, 1953) was a progressive American economist, born at Quaker Lake, Susquehanna County, Pennsylvania.  He graduated from Iowa State College in 1898, then studied with E.R.A. Seligman at Columbia (Ph.D., 1906) and for a year at the University of Leipzig (1903–1904). His dissertation was entitled History of Shipping Subsidies (1905).

From 1906 to 1913, Meeker was a professor of history, economics, and political science at Ursinus College, Collegeville, Pennsylvania and a preceptor and professor of economics at Princeton.  He knew Woodrow Wilson, then the president of Princeton, and they served together on New Jersey political boards. Both were associated with the Progressive movement for an active role for government.

President Wilson appointed Meeker Commissioner of Labor Statistics in 1913. As the commissioner of the Bureau of Labor Statistics, Meeker managed special economic studies during World War I and began its regular publication, the Monthly Labor Review, in 1915. In 1916 he was elected as a Fellow of the American Statistical Association. Meeker resigned from the administration in June 1920 to take up the opportunity to help organize the new International Labour Organization, where he was the Chief of the Scientific Division from 1920 to 1923.

Meeker served as Pennsylvania Secretary of Labor and Industry from 1923–1924, and later joined the faculty of Carleton College (1926–1927) and Yale University (1930–1936, perhaps longer). He was Director of Research of the Connecticut Department of Labor (1941–1946). He died in New Haven, Connecticut in 1953.

Meeker advocated progressive reforms, including a minimum wage, national health insurance, child labor restrictions combined with strong, State-controlled schools, workmen's compensation, and a nationwide system of public employment offices.

Bibliography

References

Columbia University alumni
1873 births
1953 deaths
American economists
American historians
American statisticians
Princeton University faculty
Yale University faculty
Bureau of Labor Statistics
Fellows of the American Statistical Association
Woodrow Wilson administration personnel